Under Military Law is a Russian - Ukrainian military - historical detective television series directed by Maxim Mekheda, Yevgeny Serov and , produced by the Star Media film company.

The premiere of the TV series in Ukraine took place on May 9, 2016, and in Russia on May 4, 2017. On Russian television, the series is broadcast on Channel One.

As of May 6, 2022, a total of five seasons of the television series have been released in Russia, including forty-four episodes.

Plot 
The plot is based on the work of employees of the Soviet military prosecutor's office and investigative agencies during the Great Patriotic War (1941-1945) and after the Victory.

Four main characters are in the center of the story: residents of Kiev, foreman Grigory Fedorenko (whose family died under bombing in the first days of the war), investigator of the Kiev military prosecutor's office Ivan Rokotov (veteran of the First Cavalry Army ), his old acquaintance, assistant to the Chief Military Prosecutor, brig military lawyer from Moscow Nikolai Mirsky and investigator of the Main Military Prosecutor's Office of the Red Army Svetlana Elagina (Mirsky's younger sister).

A group of investigators has been investigating important and complicated cases for several seasons, both on the front lines and in front-line cities.

In the second season, Ivan Rokotov and Svetlana Elagina are united by marriage.

Cast

Main cast 

  Ivan Grigoryevich Rokotov, investigator of the military prosecutor's office, military lawyer of the 2nd rank, major of justice; prosecutor of the Königsberg region (1945-1946)
 Ekaterina Klimova Svetlana Petrovna Elagina, investigator for especially important cases of the Main Military Prosecutor's Office, military lawyer, major (in the 4th season - captain) of justice, prosecutor of the city of Königsberg (in the 5th season)
 Aleksandr Pankratov-Chyorny Grigory Ivanovich Fedorenko, driver Rokotov, foreman / junior lieutenant of the MGB of the USSR
  Nikolai Trofimovich Mirsky, assistant to the Chief Military Prosecutor of the Red Army, brig military officer (seasons 1-2), went missing in battles near Kharkov (1942)

Cast (Season 1) 

  Olga Vladimirovna Sidorenko Secretary of the secret commission under the Politburo of the Central Committee of the All-Union Communist Party of Bolsheviks
  Semyon Georgievich Fedin military prosecutor of the Kiev garrison
  Pyotr Matveyevich Tomenko Senior Major of State Security
  Lozinsky major of state security
 Evgeny Efremov Khalimov investigator of the Kiev NKVD
  Denis Mikhailovich Shmelev captain of state security (inspector from Moscow)
  Aleksandr Petrovich Sergeev Investigator of the Prosecutor's Office
 Inna Belikova Zinaida Fedina's secretary (worker of the prosecutor's office)
 Igor Portyanko Bogdanenko Head of the Kiev Criminal Investigation Department (Police Major)
 Andrey Saminin Dergachov senior lieutenant, then police captain
 Alexandra Sizonenko Vorobushkina police sergeant
  Solomon Yakovlevich Rokotov's neighbor
 Sofia Pisman Bella Rokotov's neighbor, Solomon's wife
 Daria Botsmanova Nyusya Ozhogina , daughter of Rokotov's deceased friend
  Yegor Ilyich Moscow chief of Mirsky ( 3rd rank Commissar of State Security )
 Stanislav Moskvin Major of State Security Potapov
 Konstantin Koretsky Lieutenant of State Security Fishman
 Oleg Primogenov Abwehr agent Sidorov leader of a gang of criminals
 Valery Shvets Nikolay Matveyevich Ivanov Kiev criminal
 Alexander Suvorov Ivan Danilovich Kudrya lieutenant of state security (organizer of the Kiev anti-fascist underground)
 Zoryana Marchenko Maria Sergeevna Ostapenko contact Ivan Kudri

Cast (Season 2) 

 Alexey Shutov Alexander Gromov senior lieutenant, childhood friend of Elagina
 Sergei Denga Igor Vyacheslavovich Uvarov Senior Investigator of the Main Military Prosecutor's Office
 Stanislav Boklan Gray-haired criminal authority
  Olga senior dispatcher of the railway station
 Anatoly Zinovenko Moishe (Mikhail Markovich) Libman Rokotov's neighbor
 Lyudmila Gnilova Esfir Solomonovna Libman mother of Moisha Libman
 Svetlana Zelbet Nina Vasilievna Sablina military lawyer, employee of the Kharkov prosecutor's office
 Andrey Mostrenko Naum Kaminsky
 Sergey Frolov Yakov Mikhailovich Soloveichik , an employee of the Kharkov prosecutor's office
 Mark Drobot Stepan Fedorovich Flyazhnikov 3rd rank military officer, subordinate of Uvarov
 Dmitry Saranskov Aleksey Bereza company commander, captain
 Vladislav Mamchur Michael dispatcher at the station
  Egor Ilyich, Moscow chief of Mirsky
 Natalia Vasko Nina Timofeevna Guseva museum employee

Cast (Season 3) 

 Dmitry Sutyrin Viktor Sergeevich Zvyaginov SMERSH captain, head of the investigation team
  Yakov Iosifovich Blank, member of the Odessa City Party Committee
 Dmitry Kravchenko Nikolai Stepanov policeman in Odessa, captain
 Alexandra Sizonenko Junior Lieutenant Vorobushkina police officer
 Ksenia Shcherbakova Anastasia Zimina counterintelligence officer of the Black Sea Fleet, captain-lieutenant
 Sergei Bachursky Valentin Alexandrovich Strong head of the encryption service
 Anna Glaube Sofia Stavradi cipher at headquarters
 Konstantin Beloshapka Grigory Mavrodaki fiance Sofia
  Athena Feodorovna Satyras mother of Dorik, aunt of Sofia Stavradi
 Zakhar Ronzhin Dorius (Dorik) Satyras son of Athena
 Ivan Shmakov San Sanych Gorenko homeless child
  Mikhail Znamensky , a war invalid, husband of the housekeeper of the city military commissar Lidia
 Ivan Shibanov Arkady Glebovich Tikhonovich First Secretary of the Odessa City Party Committee
 Alexander Userdin Pavel Malyshev Tikhonovich's assistant
  Lev Nikolaevich Avdeev , head of the Odessa counterintelligence department of the Black Sea Fleet
 Yuri Gorbach Gorshkov , employee of the encryption department
 Oleg Chevelev Jonah German saboteur

Cast (Season 4) 

  Heinrich von Berg, Oberst Lieutenant (in active reserve), owner of a rich mansion in the German town of Insterburg (near Königsberg )
  Vitaly Sergeevich Dremov major, SMERSH officer of the army
 Anton Morozov Buynosov, Major of the Guards, commandant of the German city of Insterburg (near Königsberg) (series No. 1-2)
 Alexander Dudenkov Alexander Vasilyevich Dudenkov, senior lieutenant , acting commandant of the German city of Insterburg (near Königsberg), veterinarian
  Knopf, German, neighbor of the murdered German Krankel family, former local government official
 Andrey Arzyaev Karnaukhov, a soldier of the Red Army, being treated in a Soviet hospital in Insterburg
 Kirill Krasnov Grinko, a soldier of the Red Army, being treated in a Soviet hospital in Insterburg

Episodes 
<onlyinclude>

References 

21st-century Russian television series
2016 Russian television series debuts
2022 Russian television series endings
Detective television series